alternatively known as  is a Japanese direct-to-video horror-erotic film released in 1997 by the Japanese studio known as Museum. It is based in an original story by Go Nagai. A little after the release of the film, a manga version was also released in the magazine Comic Bazooka by Tatsumishuppan, from May 1997 to August 1997, and later released in a single tankōbon in 1997-10-25 by Mediax in the line MD Comics. The manga was later published in the compilation tankōbon Kireta Ito: Nagai Go Jisen Sakuhin shu published by Kadokawa Shoten in 2001.

The film features famous Japanese celebrity Aya Sugimoto in the role of the landlady of the onsen and the main vampire woman, ex-idol singer Yuka Onishi of Sukeban Deka III fame, and AV idol Ryo Hitomi.

External links
Kyuketsu Onsen e Yokoso  at allcinema
Kyuketsu Onsen e Yokoso  at the Japanese Movie Database
Kyuketsu Onsen e Yokoso  at the Japanese Horror Movies Database
Kyuketsu Onsen e Yokoso profile and screenshots 
Kyuketsu Onsen e Yokoso (manga)  at the World of Go Nagai webpage

1997 horror films
Go Nagai
1990s Japanese-language films
1997 films
1990s Japanese films